Orland High School is a public high school in Orland, California, United States, a city northwest of Sacramento, California, and south of Redding, California.

Academics
As of 2015, Orland High School operates on an 8:05 a.m. to 3:05 p.m. schedule. This includes five periods of instruction, a brief 10-minute break, and a lunch.

Enrollment
In the 2011–12 school year, Orland High School had an enrollment of 680 students. Orland High School is very integrated in the school years of 2011-2012 with, 0.9% American Indian/Alaska Native, 2.5% Asian, 0.1% Native Hawaiian/Pacific Islander, 0.1% Filipino, 54.1% Hispanic, 1.5% Black, and 39.5% White.

Athletics
Currently, Orland High School offers its students thirteen teams. These sports include baseball, softball, basketball, football, wrestling, volleyball, track and field, cross country, soccer, tennis, color guard, winter guard, marching band, and cheerleading.

Notable alumni
 Aldrick Rosas - Detroit Lions, NFL

References

External links

Orland High School website
Orland Unified School District

Public high schools in California
High schools in Glenn County, California
Education in Orland, California